The NPI University of Bangladesh is a private university located in Manikganj District. It was founded by former Bangladesh Chhatra League leader Shamsur Rahman and Ishaque Ali Khan Panna in 2016.

References 

Private universities in Bangladesh
Educational institutions established in 2016
2016 establishments in Bangladesh